Sir Charles Forbes was a barque built at Aberdeen in 1824. Between 1825 and 1837 she made three voyages transporting convicts to Hobart and one convict voyage to Sydney. In 1842 she made one voyage carrying emigrants from England to New Zealand under the auspices of the New Zealand Company. She was last listed in 1861.

Career
She was described as a "sharp–built ship", having moderately finer lines than was usual for a merchant ship of her time.

Sir Charles Forbes first appeared in Lloyd's Register (LR), in the volume for 1824. It showed her with Fullarton, master, M'Innes, owner, and voyage London–Calcutta.

1st convict voyage (1825): Captain Thomas Fullarton sailed from Portsmouth on 5 January 1825 and arrived at Hobart on 18 April. Sir Charles Forbes had embarked 130 male convicts and had suffered two convict deaths on her voyage. Two officers and 30 men of the 57th Regiment of Foot provided the guard. On 16 June she attempted to sail but grounded and had to put back for repairs. Still, on 21 June she sailed for Calcutta.

2nd convict voyage (1826–1827): Captain Alexander Duthie sailed from London on 16 September 1826 and arrived at Hobart on 3 January 1827. Sir Charles Forbes had embarked 73 female convicts and had suffered four convict deaths on her voyage.

3rd convict voyage (1830): Captain J. Leslie sailed from Plymouth on 5 April 1830 and arrived at Hobart on 27 July. Sir Charles Forbes had embarked 160 male convicts and had suffered two convict deaths on her voyage. The guard consisted of one officer, plus 29 other ranks, primarily from the 17th Regiment of Foot. The regiment later participated in the in two documented massacres of Aborigines.
 
4th convict voyage (1837): Captain Leslie sailed from Dublin on 11 August 1837 and arrived at Sydney on 25 December. Sir Charles Forbes had embarked 148 female convicts and had suffered one convict death on her voyage.

New Zealand immigrants (1842): Captain Thomas Bacon from Gravesend on 1 May 1842 and arrived at Nelson on 22 August. Sir Charles Forbes carried 187 settlers.

Fate
Sir Charles Forbes was last listed in 1861. She had not had an voyages listed for some years before that.

Citations

References
 
 
 

1824 ships
Ships built in Aberdeen
Age of Sail merchant ships of England
Convict ships to Tasmania
Convict ships to New South Wales
Migrant ships to New Zealand